"Any Old Time (You're Lonely and Sad)" was the third single by the Foundations. It reached number 48 on the UK Singles Chart. It was the last single they released with Clem Curtis as their lead singer. Their next single with lead singer Colin Young would give them a bigger hit with "Build Me Up Buttercup".

The B side "We Are Happy People", which was composed by Foundations trombone player Eric Allandale, was a top 10 hit in Scandinavia for Swedish group Slam Creepers’.

The Foundations would re-record the song in stereo and with Colin Young on vocals instead of Clem Curtis. This appeared on their 1968 LP released on Marble Arch MALS 1157. Clem Curtis and Alan Warner re-recorded the song in the 1980s as Clem Curtis and the Foundations.

References

1968 singles
The Foundations songs
Pye Records singles
Songs written by Tony Macaulay
Songs written by John Macleod (songwriter)
1968 songs